Sissu Falls is located on is on a diversion on the Leh–Manali Highway in Lahaul and Spiti district, Himachal Pradesh. The source of water is the suspended glaciers on the Himalayan range.

References

Waterfalls of Himachal Pradesh
Geography of Kullu district
Manali, Himachal Pradesh
Waterfalls of India